Dniester Canyon – the Dniester River canyon, located at the territory of Dniester River Valley in Ukraine. On February 3, 2010, the Regional landscape park "Dniester Canyon" was promoted to the status of the National Nature Park.

Overview

The Dniester River is the second largest and the most ecologically clean river in Ukraine . The canyon is partly flooded by reservoir waters. At its deepest it reaches around 50 meters. Dniester Canyon is a  river segment from the mouth of Zolota Lypa River to the mouth of Zbruch.

The steep canyon slopes are of limestone and it was chosen as one of the seven natural wonders of Ukraine.

Within the canyon there are more than ten karst caves and grottoes. Small waterfalls of so-called "maiden's tears", run along copse thick bryophyte rocks.

Landscape
The most valuable and picturesque part of the whole Dniester is the 250 km-stretch from the mouth of the river Zolota Lypa to the mouth of the river Zbruch, which is called the Dnister Canyon. The nature of the Dniester Canyon is specific and original. These are first of all picturesque landscapes and their versatility which impart contribute to the originality of these routes. And all this is a wild and virginal nature which gives a perfect possibility to plunge into the world of silence and calmness.

Canyon segments
Dniester Canyon is a  segment of Dniester River from the mouth of Zolota Lypa to the mouth of Zbruch.

 Dniestrovo-Beremyanskyi Canyon (situated between villages Hubyn – Beremiany – Khmeleva) is another canyon within.

Protection
The Dniester Canyon National Nature Park was established along the Dniester River course by Presidential Decree 2010 and Decree of the Minister of Environment and Natural Resources on December 12, 2011.

Tourism
The Dniester Canyon attracts thousands of water tourists each year.

Alloy on the Dniester river is one of the most interesting trips in Ukraine. Picturesque landscapes include steep rocky or forest banks of 200 m high, unique travertine rocks and geological removed layers, caves and grottoes, waterfalls, islands, monuments of nature, history, architecture, and ethnography.

Skydiving
The villages of Isakiv and Odaiv that are located at the canyon attract skydivers not only from Ukraine, but also from Belarus, Russia, Poland, Germany, and many other countries. Twice a year All-Ukrainian and International skydiving competition takes place here.

References

External links

 Seven Natural Wonders of Ukraine: Dniester Canyon
 The Dnister Canyon (with photos)
National Nature Park Dnister Canyon
Дністровський каньйон
 Presidential Decree on creation of Dniester Canyon National Park

Canyons and gorges of Ukraine
Geography of Ternopil Oblast
Parks in Ukraine
Protected areas of Ukraine
Tourist attractions in Ternopil Oblast
Natural heritage sites in Ternopil Oblast
Dniester